Artitropa erinnys, the bush night-fighter, is a species of butterfly in the family Hesperiidae. It is found in South Africa from the East Cape to KwaZulu-Natal, and Transvaal, Zimbabwe and eastern Africa.

The wingspan is 53–57 mm for males and 59–63 mm for females. Adults are on wing year-round but are scarce from May to August.

The larvae feed on Dracaena hookeriana, Dracaena afromontana, Dracaena angustifolia, Dracaena fragrans and Dracaena steudneri.

Subspecies
Artitropa erinnys erinnys (southern Mozambique, Eswatini, South Africa: coastal lowland and riverine forest from the eastern Cape and KwaZulu-Natal coast to Maputaland, spreading to the Limpopo Province)
Artitropa erinnys comorarum Oberthür, 1916 (Comoro Islands: Grand Comore, Anjouan)
Artitropa erinnys ehlersi Karsch, 1896 (Kenya: Mount Sagala, Teita Hills, Shimba Hills, Tanzania: from the coast inland to Arusha)
Artitropa erinnys nyasae Riley, 1925 (eastern Zimbabwe, southern Malawi)
Artitropa erinnys radiata Riley, 1925 (Kenya)
Artitropa erinnys vansommereni Riley, 1925 (Kenya: Meru, Nairobi, Ngong)

References

Butterflies described in 1862
Hesperiinae